The 2013–14 Ugandan Big League is the 5th season of the official second tier Ugandan football championship.

Overview
The 2013–14 Uganda Big League is being contested by 21 teams divided into two groups, the Elgon Group and the Rwenzori Group. The following clubs have been renamed since the 2012/13 season:

Artland Katale FC (formerly Koboko FC)
Hope Doves FC (formerly Aurum Roses FC).
Sadolin Paints (formerly Bugembe United FC) 

Former Uganda Super League clubs Maroons FC, Victors FC and Water FC were excluded from the FUFA Big League after they failed to apply for registration.

With effect from Tuesday 29 October 2013 FUFA de-registered Kigezi Good Samaritan FC (KGS FC) from the Big League. The Kabale-based club failed to honour their first game against Kirinya FC from Jinja. Although the match was at their home ground in Kabale, Kigezi Samaritan FC did not turn up for the match.

In December 2013 Water FC (namely National Water and Sewerage Corporation (NWSC) FC) submitted a request to FUFA to take over the fixtures of Kigezi GS FC.

Clubs within the Big League enter the Ugandan Cup.

League standings
2013–14 final league tables:

Elgon Group

Rwenzori Group

Promotion playoff

Semi-finals

Final

Championship playoff

Final

Footnotes

External links
 Uganda - List of Champions - RSSSF (Hans Schöggl)
 Ugandan Football League Tables - League321.com

Ugandan Big League seasons
Uganda
2